In Your House 16: Canadian Stampede was the 16th In Your House professional wrestling pay-per-view (PPV) event produced by the World Wrestling Federation (WWF, now WWE). It took place on July 6, 1997, at the Canadian Airlines Saddledome in Calgary, Alberta, Canada. The event's card consisted of four matches with one match held on the Free for All pre-show.

The main event was a 10-man tag team match featuring The Hart Foundation (Bret Hart, Jim Neidhart, Owen Hart, British Bulldog, and Brian Pillman) against Stone Cold Steve Austin, Ken Shamrock, Goldust, and the Legion of Doom (Hawk and Animal). On the undercard, The Undertaker defended the WWF Championship against Vader, The Great Sasuke faced Taka Michinoku, and Hunter Hearst Helmsley wrestled Mankind. 

The show received critical acclaim from wrestling publications, websites, and fans. Footage of the main event was featured in the documentary Wrestling With Shadows. The event marked Hart's official return to the ring after being sidelined for over 2 months with arthroscopic knee surgery.

Production

Background
In Your House was a series of monthly pay-per-view (PPV) shows first produced by the World Wrestling Federation (WWF, now WWE) in May 1995. They aired when the promotion was not holding one of its then-five major PPVs (WrestleMania, King of the Ring, SummerSlam, Survivor Series, and Royal Rumble), and were sold at a lower cost. In Your House 16: Canadian Stampede took place on July 6, 1997, at the Canadian Airlines Saddledome in Calgary, Alberta, Canada. The name of the show was based on the event being held in Canada, as well as the annual Calgary Stampede, which had just concluded the day before.

Storylines
In Your House 16: Canadian Stampede consisted of professional wrestling matches involving different wrestlers from pre-existing scripted feuds, plots and storylines that were played out on Raw Is War and other World Wrestling Federation (WWF) television programs. Wrestlers portrayed a villain or a hero as they followed a series of events that built tension, and culminated in a wrestling match or series of matches.

The main rivalry heading into the event involved Stone Cold Steve Austin and Bret Hart. While on hiatus from the WWF from April until October 1996, Hart received challenges from Austin. After he returned to the WWF, he feuded with Austin, who cost him a victory at the Royal Rumble match and the WWF Championship. After fighting with him on WrestleMania 13, Austin became a fan favorite, while Hart became a villain, criticizing the American fans for cheering Austin. Hart recruited his brother Owen, his brothers-in-law The British Bulldog and Jim "The Anvil" Neidhart and Austin's former partner Brian Pillman, creating the Hart Foundation, to fight with Austin. At King of the Ring, Hart challenged the five best American wrestlers of the WWF to fight his team at the event. Austin entered himself into the match the next day on WWF Raw is War, prior to his match with Brian Pillman. Before the match, the Hart foundation attacked Austin, prompting Mankind to replace him in the match. After the match, Austin and Ken Shamrock cleared the ring of the Hart Foundation, and Austin gave the Stunner finisher on Shamrock. Next week, Austin and Pillman fought as the Hart Foundation members were handcuffed into the ring posts, but they managed to release themselves and to attack Austin, who was rescued by Shamrock, Mankind and Goldust. After a brief brawl between Austin and Shamrock, which was broken by the Legion of Doom, Goldust suggested that he, Shamrock and LOD will team up with Austin in the 5 on 5 match at the event, to which Austin agreed. On the June 23 edition of Raw Is War, LOD fought The Godwinns, and after their victory, the Hart Foundation attacked them and Shamrock. Next week, while Austin fought Neidhart, Bret Hart (Who attacked Shamrock during the match) came and attacked Austin, putting the figure-four leglock on Austin while on the ring post.

Another predominant feud involved the WWF Champion The Undertaker and Vader. On the June 23 episode of Raw Is War, Vader was announced as the number one contender for the championship, as Undertaker had to team up with Vader in a tournament match for the WWF Tag Team Championship against the Nation of Domination's team of D'Lo Brown and Faarooq. Vader's manager, Paul Bearer, forced The Undertaker to do as he said or else he will tell a secret from the Undertaker's past. After the Undertaker attacked Vader in the match, Bearer told the secret next week: Throughout The Undertaker's childhood and teen years, he lived in a funeral home with his parents and half-brother. According to Paul Bearer, The Undertaker killed his parents and caused his half-brother's face to be bruised and scarred by setting the funeral home ablaze. The Undertaker denied it and said that Kane was the one that burnt the house. During an attack from the Undertaker after Vader's match with Rockabilly, Bearer said he heard that from Kane himself, because unbeknownst to The Undertaker, Kane had survived the fire and was still alive.

Another rivalry heading into event was the continuation of battle between Mankind and Hunter Hearst Helmsley. At the King of the Ring event, Helmsley and Mankind fought at the finals of the King of the ring tournament as Helmsley won, and he kept attacking Mankind after the match. The day after that, Mankind requested a rematch, to which Helmsley agreed. On the June 30 edition of Raw Is War, Mankind and Brian Pillman fought in a match, which Pillman won by a count-out after Helmsley interfered.

Event

In the first contest of the night, King Hunter Hearst Helmsley took on Mankind. The match ended in a double count out after a brutal brawl that saw Helmsley's bodyguard, Chyna get involved. The two men didn't stop fighting though, taking their brawl through the crowd into the parking lot. The two men were finally broken up, with Helmsley left bloodied.

The second match saw Taka Michinoku taking on Junior Heavyweight legend The Great Sasuke. After some back and forth action, The Great Sasuke won the match via a Tiger Suplex followed by a pin.

The semi-main event saw The Undertaker retain his WWF Championship against NJPW legend, Vader, accompanied by Taker's former manager, Paul Bearer. The Undertaker won with a Tombstone Piledriver into a pin to retain his WWF Championship.

Before the main event, Farmer's Daughter performed "O Canada".

The Main Event saw Canada's Hart Foundation, consisting of Bret Hart, Brian Pillman, 'The British Bulldog' Davey Boy Smith, Jim Neidhart, and Owen Hart defeat Ken Shamrock, Goldust, The Legion of Doom (Animal & Hawk), and 'Stone Cold' Steve Austin. Owen Hart won the 10-man tag for the Hart Foundation via a roll up after members from the Hart Family started attacked Stone Cold. After the match, The entire Hart Family got into the ring and celebrated with the Hart Foundation, making sure everyone from the other team left the ring. Austin came back soon afterwards by himself and got attacked by the Hart Family as the Canadian crowd chanted "Austin Sucks!" Austin would get handcuffed by security before being forced to the back.

Reception
This pay-per-view was awarded Best Major Show for 1997 by Dave Meltzer's Wrestling Observer Newsletter. In 2013, WWE released a list of their "15 best pay-per-views ever", with In Your House 16: Canadian Stampede ranked at number ten. In 2019, Troy L. Smith of Cleveland.com released a list of the "50 greatest wrestling pay-per-views of all time" from every professional wrestling promotion in the world, with the event ranked at number seven.

Aftermath
Stone Cold Steve Austin's feud with Bret Hart ended after Canadian Stampede but immediately started a feud with his brother Owen the following night by attacking him while he was singing the Canadian national anthem. This led to a title match between the two for the Intercontinental Championship at SummerSlam with Austin giving the stipulation that if he lost, he will kiss Hart's ass. During the match, Hart delivered a botched piledriver to Austin, legitimately breaking his neck and temporarily paralyzing him. Despite this, Austin was able to win the match and the title but due to the severity of his neck injury, he was forced to relinquish the Intercontinental Championship and the Tag Team Championships. Austin eventually recovered and ended his feud with Hart by defeating him for the Intercontinental Championship at Survivor Series.

Results

See also
Professional wrestling in Canada

References

16: Canadian Stampede
Events in Calgary
1997 in Alberta
Professional wrestling in Alberta
1997 WWF pay-per-view events
July 1997 events in Canada
WWE in Canada